Billabong is an Australian English word for a small lake, specifically an oxbow lake.

Billabong may also refer to:
 Billabong (clothing), a brand of clothing and surfing wear
 Billabong, a 1969 short film by Will Hindle

See also